Labrisomus conditus, the Masquerader hairy blenny, is a species of labrisomid blenny native to the Fernando de Noronha Archipelago, off northeastern Brazil, and it has been reported from Florida, United States, in the Atlantic Ocean.  This species can reach a length of  SL.

References

conditus
Fish described in 2009